Dhoondte Reh Jaaoge! is a 1998 Bollywood movie. The movie that introduced Antara Mali starred Amar Upadhyay opposite her, besides Naseeruddin Shah, Satish Shah, Amrish Puri, Prem Chopra, Tinnu Anand, Javed Jaffrey and Shammi Kapoor among others. The movie was directed by Kumar Bhatia, who also wrote the story, dialogues and screenplay.

Cast
Antara Mali as Renu
Amar Upadhyay as Ajay/Devdas
Naseeruddin Shah as Tiger
Satish Shah as Seth Motichand
Amrish Puri
Prem Chopra
Tinnu Anand
Dalip Tahil as Anthony Macaroni/Tony
Javed Jaffrey
Shammi Kapoor
Dinesh Hingoo
Ajit Vachhani as Medical College Principal
Samuel John
Babloo Mukherjee

Music
"Aaja Aaye Majaa" - Alka Yagnik, Udit Narayan
"Bolun Kisi Se To" - Alka Yagnik
Instrumental Medley
"Jaaneman Jo Hua" - Udit Narayan, Alka Yagnik, Abhijeet
"Na Tum Bolo" - Kumar Sanu, Alka Yagnik
"Suno Honey Yeh Kahani" - Vinod Rathod

References

External links
 Dhoondte Reh Jaaoge! on Youtube
 Publicity material and memorabilia on Osianama

1990 films
1990s Hindi-language films
Films scored by Jatin–Lalit